Woodstock railway station is a Metrorail railway station in Woodstock, Cape Town. It is the first station after the Cape Town terminus on the old main line to Bellville. Services on all of Metrorail's lines pass through the station.

The station building, located between Porter Street to the north and Grey Street to the south, is elevated above the six tracks that pass through. The station has three island platforms, each serving a pair of tracks.

Services

References

Railway stations in Cape Town
Metrorail Western Cape stations